Sidi Thabet is a town and commune (municipality) in the Ariana Governorate, Tunisia.

As of 2004, it had a total population of 8,909.

History 
It is suggested as the most plausible site for the Ancient Roman city and former bishopric Cissita, which remains a Latin Catholic titular see.

See also 
 List of cities in Tunisia

References 

Populated places in Ariana Governorate
Communes of Tunisia
Tunisia geography articles needing translation from French Wikipedia